Apostasy in Judaism is the rejection of Judaism and possible conversion to another religion by a Jew. Equivalent expressions for apostate in Hebrew that are used by rabbinical scholars include mumar (literally "one who is changed" [out of his faith]), poshea Yisrael (literally, "transgressor of Israel"), and kofer (literally "denier"). Similar terms are meshumad (lit. "destroyed one"), and min or Epikoros, which denote heresy and the negation of God and Judaism, implying atheism.

Classes of apostates and relevance
A mumar is someone who does not observe a certain mitzvah or who doesn't observe any mitzvot at all. Rabbinic categories differentiate between a mumar ledavar echad (מומר לדבר אחד) who doesn't observe a certain mitzvah, and a mumar lekhol hatorah kulah (מומר לכל התורה כולה) who doesn't observe any of the Torah. Likewise they differentiate between a mumar l'teyavon (מומר לתיאבון) who transgresses mitzvah(s) wantonly due to craving (teyavon) or convenience, versus a mumar l'hakh`is (מומר להכעיס) meaning one who transgresses out of spite, who defies the mitzvah willfully.

Some halakhic aspects of this status include: a mumar is treated as a gentile in regard to commerce; it is forbidden to cause him to stumble into doing something forbidden; regarding matrimony, ritual purity, and inheritance (with some exceptions) he is an Israelite; the sages prescribed no mourning for a mumar.

However today another category, tinok shenishba ("captured infant"), a Jew who sins inadvertently as a result of having been raised without an appreciation for the thought and practices of Judaism, is widely applied and should be considered.

Examples

In the Bible

In the Talmud
In the Talmud, Elisha ben Abuyah (referred to as Acher, the "Other One") is singled out as an apostate by the rabbis.

Medieval Spain
In Medieval Spain, a systematic conversion of Jews to Christianity took place, largely under threats and force. The apostasy of these conversos provoked the indignation of some Jews in Spain and  it was made illegal to call a converso by the epithet tornadizo (renegade).

Several inquisitors of the Spanish Inquisition, such as Tomás de Torquemada and Francisco de Quiñones the Bishop of Coria, are thought to be descendants of apostate Jews. Known apostates who made their mark in history by attempting to convert other Jews in the 14th and 15th centuries include Juan de Valladolid and Astruc Remoch.

Some Spanish Jews, however, remained crypto-Jews despite being compelled to convert to Christianity (see Anusim). They are also called Marranos.

Sabbatai Zevi and Jacob Frank
In 1648 Sabbatai Zevi claimed to be the Jewish Messiah.  His Jewish followers were known as Sabbateans. Zevi converted to Islam in 1666.  Afterwards, some of his followers willingly converted but continued to practise Sabbatean rituals.  These people became known as the Dönmeh.

In the 1750s Jacob Frank claimed he was the reincarnation of Zevi and attracted many followers in Poland, known as Frankists. In 1759, with Frank's encouragement, more than 500 Frankists were baptized as Catholics.  Frank himself was also baptized, with the King of Poland as his godfather.

See also
 Conversion of Jews to Islam
 Heresy in Judaism
 Humanistic Judaism
 Jewish atheism
 Jewish Buddhist
 Jewish schisms
 Jewish secularism
 List of converts to Christianity from Judaism
 List of Jewish atheists and agnostics
 Messianic Judaism
 Off the derech
 Religious disaffiliation
 Self-hating Jew
 Zera Yisrael

Notes and references

External links
 

Apostasy
 
Jewish law
Heresy in Judaism